Zero Zero may refer to:

Music
"Zero Zero", a song from the album Hesitant Alien by Gerard Way
"Zero Zero", a theatrical musical production and album of said production by Mike Batt
"Zero Zero", an instrumental song from the album The Hush by the Scottish rock band Texas

Other
Zero Zero (comic), an alternative comics anthology
Zero-zero ejection seat, a classification of ejection seat for aircraft that is capable of ejecting the occupant in the event of a ground or low-altitude incident.
Zero-zero or 0–0, The starting score for a game of singles pickleball